UofG is an abbreviation that can mean:

a university in Belgium
 University of Ghent

a university in Canada
 University of Guelph

a university in Ghana
 University of Ghana 

a university in Guyana
 University of Guyana

a university in Mexico
 University of Guadalajara

a university in Poland
 University of Gdańsk

a university in the United Kingdom
 University of Glasgow
a university in the United States
 University of Georgia
 University of Guam, in the U.S. territory of Guam

See also
 UG (disambiguation) - for things that can be abbreviated "UG"